The Oswego United States Post Office in Oswego, Kansas is listed on the National Register of Historic Places as US Post Office--Oswego, located at 819 4th Street. Built in 1940, it was listed on the National Register of Historic Places in 1989.

It is Classical Revival in style, with design attributed to Louis A. Simon.

A WPA tempera on canvas mural by Robert E. Larter entitled Farm Life is displayed in the lobby that depicts the four seasons of farming life.  The mural, installed on July 31, 1940, measures 12 feet 10 inches by 4 feet 6 inches. Federally commissioned murals were produced from 1934 to 1943 in the United States through the Section of Painting and Sculpture, later called the Section of Fine Arts, of the Treasury Department.

References

Government buildings on the National Register of Historic Places in Kansas
Neoclassical architecture in Kansas
Government buildings completed in 1940
Labette County, Kansas